Stanley Harwood (June 23, 1926 – August 20, 2010) was an American politician who served in the New York State Assembly from 1966 to 1972.

He died of lung cancer on August 20, 2010, at age 84.

References

1926 births
2010 deaths
Democratic Party members of the New York State Assembly